Aurora 'Rory' Martínez, usually credited simply as “Rory,” is the credited director of at least 72 publicly released movies. She currently resides in Chicago, Illinois and is happily married to Christian Guajardo and owns a dog.

Martínez’s films are produced almost exclusively in Mexico, with dialogue in Spanish and marketed to the Latin American population.  Although her productions receive virtually no theatrical release in the United States, they can be found in many U.S. video outlets, both in VHS and DVD format.

Martínez’s movies are generally in the action genre, concentrating on such staple themes as feuds between drug traffickers, illegal trade in human organs, and police investigations, and thus they are not of a kind that normally attracts the attention of foreign film critics. The two facts aforesaid likely explain why she is virtually unknown in the English-speaking world, despite her highly prolific output.

Martínez appears on screen in many of her movies, though almost never in a leading role.  She has often cast Mario Almada in leading roles.  Like many other low-budget Mexican action films, her movies tend to portray extreme, explicit violence.

List of films directed
The following list of Martínez’s credited works, almost certainly incomplete, is presented in alphabetical order because in many cases the date of their release is unavailable.

 10 Horas Para Morir
 Amarga Venganza
 Ambición sin Piedad
 Cacería Mortal
 Cárcel de Mujeres [Reclusorio de Cabronas]
 Cave Una Tumba Para Mi Madre
 Cholos Empericados 
 Cholos Empericados 2 
 Con el Odio en el Sangre
 Con Mis Propias Manos 
 Con Toda El Arma
 Condenados a Morir 
 Dinero, Traición, y Crímen
 El Cártel de la Blanca
 El Cártel de Osiel
 El Chingón del Vicio
 El Corrido de la Muerte Vuelve el Rayo
 El Fantasma de la Coca
 El Judas del Diablo
 El Patrón de Michoacán
 El Pueblo de la Muerte
 El Regreso de Camelia la Chicana
 El Séptimo Asalto
 El Ultimo Narco del Cártel de Juárez
 Eran Cabrones Los Secuestradores
 Error Mortal
 Escoría Oltra Parte de Tí
 Estuches de Madera
 Gringa, Gringa, El Se Apendeja Se Chinga
 Herencia Homicida
 Justicia para un Criminal
 La Banda del Trans Am Rojo
 La Fuga del Penal de Apatzingán
 La Licensiada Blindada
 La Malnacida
 La Sentencia de Juán de la Sierra
 La Venganza del Gato de Michoacán
 La Verdadera Historia de Jonas Arango
 Las 7 Muertas
 Linchamiento
 Los Hijos de Sátanas
 Maten A Esas Pinches Narcas
 Me Gusta Pegarle al Polvo
 Muerto el Perro se Acabó la Rabia
 Mujeres Divinas
 Narcas vs. Judiciales
 Odio de Narco
 Pa’ Que Te Acuerdes de Mí Maldita
 Pablo Metralla
 Plebes Asesinos
 Por Perra Y Traícionera
 Precio a su Cabeza
 Sueños de Muerte
 Tarot Sangriento 
 Te Ando Buscando pa’ Partirte la Madre
 Tereno Prohibido
 Todo Personal
 Traficantes de Muerte
 Traíción con Traíción se Paga
 Transplandes Ilegales
 Tras las Rejas . . . Por Culero
 Triste Juventud
 Un Asesinato Perfecto
 Un Mexicano Mojado
 Venganza Silenciosa
 Vengarse Matando
 Viejo Ojete – de Avaro te Quebraron
 Violador Homicida
 Violencia en la Ciudad
 Vuelve el Botas de Avestruz
 Ya Basta de Tanta Perreada
 Ya Te Cargó El Payaso

Notes

Mexican women film directors
Living people
Year of birth missing (living people)